Maya S Krishnan is an Indian actress, model and singer who works in the Tamil film industry. She made her acting debut in the college musical film Vaanavil Vaazhkai (2015).

Early life
Maya was born in Madurai, Tamilnadu, India and did her schooling in TVS Lakshmi Matriculation Higher Secondary School, Madurai and she did her engineering at Amrita University school of engineering, Bangalore. She was a child gymnast and placed 6th in gymnastics during the Nationals. Her sister, Swagatha S Krishnan is a singer in the Tamil industry.

Career 
Maya changed her focus to theatre and film when she debuted in James Vasanthan's Vaanavil Vaazhkai, where she had to cut her hair short to play a singer She played a reporter in Thodari (2016) and also appeared in movies like Dhruva Natchathiram, 2.0, Magalir Mattum and Server Sundaram.

Maya is part of the perch theater group which toured various cities performing the stage play Kira Kozhambu along with Ravindra Vijay and Anand Sami. They have done almost 100 performances across the country so far.
The play solely featured the three actors and a bench. The play was based on Ki. Rajanarayanan's collection of short stories titled Nattuppura Kadhai Kalanjiyam with Anandsami reprising his role from the original play. A critic stated that "Actors Anand Sami, Maya S. Krishnan and Ravindra Vijay were in their elements with their seamless blend of art and entertainment".

Filmography

Films

Web series

Theater

References

External links 

 Maya S Krishnan on IMDd

Indian film actresses
Tamil actresses
Living people
21st-century Indian actresses
Indian television actresses
Actresses in Tamil cinema
Actresses from Madurai
1996 births